Alan Lawrence Hoffman (born April 7, 1966) is an American lawyer, government official, and corporate executive who serves as Senior Vice President, Global Public Policy and Government Affairs at PepsiCo.   Prior to joining PepsiCo, Hoffman served as Deputy Chief of Staff to the Vice President of the United States Joe Biden and Deputy Assistant to the President. While in the Vice President's office, Hoffman worked on a variety of issues including crime, drugs and protecting intellectual property, marking the third time Hoffman had worked for Joe Biden. Previously, Hoffman served as Chief of Staff to Senator Biden from 1998–2003 and from 2006-2008 while Biden was running for president.

Life and education
Hoffman received his B.A. in American Civilization from Lafayette College in Easton, Pennsylvania and his J.D. and M.P.A. from the USC Gould School of Law and the USC Price School of Public Policy.

Hoffman is married to Lizzie Francis and lives in Washington, D.C., with their dogs Brinkley and Franklin.

Career
Hoffman is credited with helping Biden secure passage of numerous pieces of legislation including the criminal provisions of Sarbanes-Oxley and legislation closing the gap in sentencing between crack and powder cocaine.

In 2008, after Biden withdrew from the presidential race, Hoffman was the Senior Vice President for External Relations for the University of California system.

Earlier in his career, Hoffman was Vice President for External Relations at the RAND Corporation, Vice President at Timmons and Company, Assistant United States Attorney in Philadelphia, Special Counsel to the Assistant Attorney General at the Department of Justice, Special Counsel to the Assistant Secretary at the Department of Health and Human Services and an attorney at the law firms Pepper, Hamilton and Scheetz.

See also
Office of the Vice President of the United States

References 

1966 births
PepsiCo people
Obama administration personnel
Biden administration personnel
Lafayette College alumni
Living people
USC Gould School of Law alumni
USC Sol Price School of Public Policy alumni